Jalan Sebertak-Bera Selatan, Federal Route 1572, is a federal road in Pahang, Malaysia. It is a main route to Kota Bahagia, Bandar Muadzam Shah and Tasik Bera. At most sections, the Federal Route 1572 was built under the JKR R5 road standard, with a speed limit of 90 km/h.

List of junctions

Malaysian Federal Roads